Chinese nationality may refer to:

 Chinese nationality law, the law which defines who is or may become a People's Republic of China (PRC) national
 Hong Kong Special Administrative Region passport, passport issued to PRC nationals with permanent residence in Hong Kong
 Macao Special Administrative Region passport, passport issued to PRC nationals with permanent residence in the Macau
 Taiwanese nationality law, the law which defines who is or may become a Republic of China (ROC) national
 Zhonghua minzu, (English: "Chinese nation" or "Chinese race"), a key political term in modern Chinese history
 Chinese nationalism, form of nationalism which promotes the cultural and national unity of the Chinese
 Chinese people, the various individuals or groups of people associated with China
 Chinese Nation, a thought experiment in the philosophy of mind

See also 
 British nationality law and Hong Kong, British legal treatment of subjects from Hong Kong
 Ethnic minorities in China, the non-Han Chinese population in the People's Republic of China
 List of ethnic groups in China